Parexel International is an American provider of biopharmaceutical services. It conducts clinical trials on behalf of its pharmaceutical clients to expedite the drug approval process.  It is the second largest clinical research organization in the world and has helped develop approximately 95% of the 200 top-selling biopharmaceuticals on the market today. The company publishes the annual Parexel R&D Statistical Sourcebook, operates the Parexel-Academy, and councils all of the top 50 biopharmaceutical and top 30 biotechnology companies.

Parexel was founded in 1982 by Josef von Rickenbach and organic chemist Anne B. Sayigh initially to advise Japanese and German firms on how to navigate the FDA approval process. The firm has grown organically over the years and through 40 acquisitions. Josef von Rickenbach is credited with establishing Parexel's culture and practices based on the principles he experienced as a researcher at Schering-Plough in Lucerne, Switzerland, before leaving the company upon retiring in 2018.

In 1990, the firm expanded internationally and established new practice areas. By 1999 it had a staff of 4,500 and 45 offices.  In the 2000s, it grew to over 18,000 employees. Parexel's consulting and clinical trial work has helped establish many household drug brands and contributed to numerous successes in modern pharmacology.

The company was acquired by private equity firm Pamplona Capital Management for approximately $5.0 billion. The deal closed in September 2017. On July 2, 2021, Parexel announced a merger agreement under which it would be acquired by EQT IX fund and Goldman Sachs for $8.5 billion. EQT and Goldman Sachs completed the acquisition on November 15, 2021.

Acquisition history 

 June 1996: Parexel acquires in separate transactions: 
Caspard Consultants, a Paris-based contract research organization, and
 Sitebase Clinical Systems, Inc., a provider of remote data entry technology designed to enhance the quality and timeliness of clinical trial data.
 August 1996: Parexel acquires in separate transactions for a combined 1,008,304 own shares of common stock:
Lansal Clinical Pharmaceutics, Limited, a contract research organization located in Israel, and
 State and Federal Associates, Inc., a Washington, D.C.-based provider of medical marketing and related consulting services to the health care and pharmaceutical industries.
 March 1997: Parexel acquires in separate transactions for a combined 210,000 own shares of common stock:
RESCON, Inc. a medical marketing business located in the Washington, D.C. area, and
 Sheffield Statistical Services, Ltd., a company located in the United Kingdom that specializes in biostatistical analysis.
 November 1997: Parexel acquires substantially all of the assets of Hayden Image Processing Group, a Colorado corporation developing software for analyzing and measuring high resolution medical images, and announces its strategic alliance with The IRIS Group S.A. based in Belgium, specializing in intelligent optical character recognition technology.
 December 1997: Parexel acquires Kemper-Masterson, Inc, a management consulting firm on FDA and other regulatory matters to the pharmaceutical, biotechnology and medical device industries based in Massachusetts.
 March 1998: Parexel acquires four companies:
PPS Europe Limited, subsequently renamed Parexel MMS Europe Limited, a medical marketing firm based in the United Kingdom, and Genesis Pharma Strategies Limited, a physician-focused marketing and clinical communications firm servicing the international pharmaceutical industry, for $113.1 million in own common stock;
MIRAI B.V., a full service, pan-European contract research organization based in the Netherlands, for $26 million in own common stock;
LOGOS GmbH, a provider of regulatory services to pharmaceutical manufacturers, for $3.9 million in own common stock.
 March 1999: Parexel acquires Groupe PharMedicom S.A., a French provider of post-regulatory services to pharmaceutical manufacturers, based in Paris and Orléans and employing approximately 70 people, in exchange for approximately 199,600 shares of the company's common stock.
 April 1999: Covance Inc. announced it would acquire its competitor Parexel for $612.7 million in stock and combine the two drug research and development companies under the name Covance Parexel Inc., only to call off the agreement two months later.
 September 1999: Parexel acquires CEMAF S.A., a Phase I clinical research and bioanalytical laboratory located in Poitiers, France for an initial cash payment of approximately $3.0 million.
 September 2000: Parexel acquires a majority interest in FARMOVS, a clinical pharmacology research business and bioanalytical laboratory located in Bloemfontein, South Africa for approximately $3.0 million. A few weeks later the company acquired a clinical pharmacology unit located in Northwick Park Hospital in Harrow, U.K. from British pharmaceutical company GlaxoWellcome Inc.
 July 2001: Parexel acquires Edyabe, a clinical research organization in Latin America with offices in Argentina and Brazil, for approximately $1.6 million in cash.
 October 2002: Parexel acquires Invantage Inc, a privately held company based in Cambridge, MA providing software and services to the pharmaceutical and biotechnology industries, including DataWeb Enterprise Edition, a web-based data repository of potential clinical investigators combined with a decision support environment for initiating clinical trials.
 October 2002: Parexel acquires Pracon & HealthIQ (a division of Excerpta Medica which was then a subsidiary of Reed Elsevier plc), a provider of specialized sales and marketing services based in Reston, VA and Orange, CA with approximately employees, for approximately $1.7 million in cash.
 January 2003: Parexel acquires FWPS Group Limited, a provider of software for clinical trial management systems in Birmingham, UK, for approximately $11.9 million in cash and shares.
 March 2004: Parexel buys the remaining majority of outstanding shares of 3Clinical Research AG, a clinical research organization with expertise in Phase I and Phase IIa Proof-Of-Concept studies in Berlin, Germany, for $11.7 million in cash.
 October 2004: Parexel acquires Integrated Marketing Concepts (IMC), a privately held company based in Whitehall, PA, provider of professional marketing and communication services specialized in clinical trial patient recruitment and retention, sales lead management, teleservices, call center services, fulfillment, focus group and database management, and market research.
 July 2005: Parexel acquires Qdot Pharma, a Phase I and IIa Proof of Concept clinical pharmacology business located in George, South Africa for approximately $3.0 million plus additional payments of up to approximately $3.0 million in contingent purchase price if Qdot achieves certain established financial targets through September 28, 2008.
 August 2005: Parexel buys the remaining 2.2% of its information technology subsidiary Perceptive Informatics Inc., for $4.8 million in cash.
 October 2006: Parexel forms a joint venture arrangement (taking 75% equity interest) with Synchron Research Services Private Limited, under which Synchron transferred its clinical trial business operations located in Bangalore, India to a newly formed entity, Parexel International Synchron Private Limited.
 October 2006: Parexel acquires California Clinical Trials Medical Group, Inc. and Behavioral and Medical Research, LLC, both headquarters in San Diego, CA, providing a broad range of specialty Phase I – IV clinical research services through four clinical sites in California, for $65 million.
 October 2007: Parexel acquires Apex International Clinical Research Co. Ltd (in which Parexel has held a minority stake since April 2003), a Taiwan-based privately held contract research organization whose business spans mainland China, Hong Kong, India, Taiwan, Singapore, Indonesia, South Korea, Malaysia, Thailand, the Philippines, New Zealand, and Australia, for around $50.9 million.
 August 2008: Parexel acquires ClinPhone plc, a provider of telephone and web-based systems used in clinical trials, headquartered in Nottingham, England, with 731 employees, for $182 million.
 December 2012: Parexel acquires LIQUENT Inc., a global provider of regulatory information management solutions, headquartered in Horsham, PA with additional offices in the United Kingdom, Germany and India, employing nearly 300 individuals, for approximately $72 million.
 April 2013: Parexel acquires Heron Group, a life sciences consultancy that provides commercialization services for biopharmaceutical companies, headquartered in Luton, U.K., with additional offices in India, Sweden, and the U.S., for up to $38.2 million.
 July 2014: Parexel acquires ATLAS Medical Services, a clinical research service provider in Turkey, the Middle East and North Africa headquartered in Istanbul with 35 employees.
 October 2014: Parexel acquires ClinIntel Limited, a provider of clinical randomization and trial supply management services headquartered in Crawley, UK.
 April 2015: Parexel acquires Quantum Solutions India, a provider of outsourced safety management solutions (pharmacovigilance) with approximately 1500 employees.
 February 2016: Parexel acquires Health Advances LLC, an independent life sciences strategy consulting firm with 120 employees.
 September 2016: Parexel acquires ExecuPharm Inc, a global functional service provider headquartered in King of Prussia, PA.
 September 2020: Parexel completes purchase of Roam Analytics, integrating its natural language processing and software development capabilities into the AI Labs.
 February 2020: Parexel acquires Model Answers, a consultancy firm based in Brisbane, Queensland, Australia.
 July 2021: Parexel is acquired by EQT IX fund and the Private Equity business within Goldman Sachs Asset Management from Pamplona Capital Management LP for $8.5 billion.
 January 2021: Following the strategic separation of the Parexel Informatics business from Parexel International, a spin-off, Calyx, a provider of medical imaging, eClinical and regulatory solutions and services to solve complex challenges in clinical research, is launched as an independent company.
 November 2021: EQT and Goldman Sachs completed the acquisition of Parexel on November 15, 2021.

TGN1412 clinical trial 

In March 2006, a Parexel-run trial on behalf of TeGenero, the now bankrupt German biotechnology firm, on its anti-inflammatory drug TGN1412 to treat rheumatoid arthritis, multiple sclerosis or leukaemia, caused severe inflammation and multiple organ failure in six healthy volunteers at a facility based at Northwick Park Hospital in London. The drug had been tested on animals but this was the first test on humans.

Parexel became the target of legal proceedings from lawyers representing the injured volunteers after the insurance policy of TeGenero was unable to provide sufficient compensation. When the liable company subsequently declared bankruptcy,  lawyers for the volunteers initiated legal proceeding against Parexel and the two parties later entered into talks; the results of this meeting have not been made public.

A documentary shown in the UK on 28 September 2006 featuring journalist Brian Deer as part of Channel 4's Dispatches series exposed uncertainty about the existence of data that should mandatorily have been submitted by TeGenero to the Medicines and Healthcare products Regulatory Agency (MHRA) prior to the trial indicating whether TGN1412 had been adequately tested on human blood in vitro. Concerns were also raised about whether a safe human dosage was properly obtained by TeGenero. The MHRA however concluded that none of the companies involved could be held responsible for the outcome of the test and that the adverse events that occurred were most likely caused by an unpredicted biological action of the drug in humans.

References

External links 
Official website

Biotechnology companies of the United States
Companies based in Massachusetts
Contract research organizations
Companies formerly listed on the Nasdaq